Guy W. McConnell was a film writer, director and producer, and was also the leader of the short-lived Wholesome Films company. Under McComnell's leadership, the company pledged to adapt stories true to original author's work.

He lived in Wrightstown, Pennsylvania.

Filmography
Cinderella and the Magic Slipper (1917), director
The Penny Philanthropist (1917), director
Pearl of the Army (1917), story
The Invisible Ray (1920), a serial
 Tropical Love (1921)

References

People from Bucks County, Pennsylvania
American screenwriters
American film directors
American film producers